Binta Labaran (professionally known as Fati Niger) is a Nigerien singer and actress who has earned the title "Gimbiyar Mawakan Hausa" (translated to "Princess of Hausa music"). She was born and bought up in Maradi, Niger where she had her Quranic education before moving to Nigeria to pursue her singing career. Fati Niger has produced 4 albums with over 500 songs to her credit. She is from the Hausa ethnic group.

Early life and career
Fati Niger was born and bought up in Maradi, Niger. Growing up, she has always had a passion for singing especially traditional Hausa songs which are mostly sung during a full moon night among the youngsters in Hausa Villages.

After visiting her sister in 2004 in Nigeria, she discovered a thriving music industry in the city of Kano. There, she sought her sister's advice and consent before recording her first song at the studio of Ali Baba in the city of Kano.

Discography
Fati has produced 4 albums and over 500 songs. She has also appeared in various Hausa Kannywood movies.

Songs
Fati Nijar, she is famous for many movie songs, political and party songs. Her song 'Girma-Girma',(in English; God is greater
-God is greater) raised her status where she became famous and known around the world.

References

Living people
21st-century Nigerian actresses
21st-century Nigerian singers
Year of birth missing (living people)